The following are incomplete lists of notable expressways, tunnels, bridges, roads, avenues, streets, crescents, squares and bazaars in Hong Kong.

Many roads on the Hong Kong Island conform to the contours of the hill landscape. Some of the roads on the north side of Hong Kong Island and southern Kowloon have a grid-like pattern. The roads are generally designed to British standards. Expressways generally conform to British motorway standards.

Usually, higher speed limits such as  have been raised to facilitate traffic flow along main roads and trunk roads. Typically, the highest speed limit in all tunnels and suspension bridges is 80 km/h, while for other roads such as toll plaza areas and slip roads that do not lead to other expressways the speed limits are recommended to be reduced to the default 50 km/h speed limit.

Routes
Hong Kong's Transport Department is responsible for management of road traffic, regulation of public transport services and operation of major transport infrastructures, while Highways Department is responsible for planning, design, construction and maintenance of the public road system. 

In 2004, a new strategic route marking system was put in place, with most existing routes renumbered and exits to key places or to another route also numbered. (For example, a journey from Yau Ma Tei to the airport uses Route 3, taking Exit 5 to join Route 8. It is therefore identified as "3-5-8".) Routes 1 to 3 are cross-harbour north–south routes following the order in which the harbour tunnels were opened. Routes 4, 5, 7 and 8 run east–west, numbered from south to north. Route 9 circumscribes the New Territories. Route 10 runs from western New Territories from Route 9 and bends northward towards and passes the border to Shenzhen. However, the new system has caused some confusion to drivers used to relying on destination signs.

The routes are designated as follows:
Route 1: Aberdeen – Wong Chuk Hang – Aberdeen Tunnel – Causeway Bay – Cross-Harbour Tunnel – Kowloon Tong – Lion Rock Tunnel – Sha Tin (to join Route 9)
Route 2: Quarry Bay – Eastern Cross-Harbour Tunnel – Kwun Tong Bypass – Tate's Cairn Tunnel – Ma Liu Shui (to join Route 9)
Route 3: Sai Ying Pun – Western Cross-Harbour Tunnel – West Kowloon Highway – Kwai Chung – Tsing Yi – Cheung Tsing Tunnel – Ting Kau Bridge – Tai Lam Tunnel – Yuen Long (to join Route 9)
Route 4: Chai Wan – Island Eastern Corridor – Quarry Bay – Causeway Bay – Wan Chai – Central – Sheung Wan – Sai Ying Pun – Kennedy Town
Route 5: Ngau Tau Kok – Kowloon Bay – Airport Tunnel – Hung Hom – Yau Ma Tei – Lai Chi Kok – Kwai Chung – Tsuen Wan (to join Route 9)
Route 6: Reserved for future route. Proposed Central Kowloon Route – Proposed Southeast Kowloon T2 Route – Proposed Tseung Kwan O – Lam Tin Tunnel
Route 7: Tseung Kwan O – Tseung Kwan O Tunnel – Kwun Tong – Wong Tai Sin – Sham Shui Po – Lai Chi Kok – Kwai Chung (to join Route 5)
Route 8: Chek Lap Kok (Airport) – Tsing Ma Bridge – Tsing Yi – Stonecutters Island – Lai Chi Kok – Sha Tin to join Route 9. 
Route 9: Shing Mun Tunnel – Tai Wai – Sha Tin – Ma Liu Shui – Tai Po – Fanling – Sheung Shui – San Tin – Yuen Long – - Tuen Mun – Sham Tseng – Tsuen Wan
Route 10: Airport – Tuen Mun, Lam Tei – Shekou, Shenzhen

Expressways
The following list is sorted by length:

Tunnels, bridges, viaducts, and flyovers

Roads, avenues, streets, bazaars, squares, crescents

Hong Kong Island
Eastern District

A Kung Ngam Road
A Kung Ngam Village Road
Aldrich Bay Road
Aldrich Street
Big Wave Bay Road
Braemar Hill Road
Chai Wan Road
Cheung Man Road
Ching Wah Street
Cloud View Road
Electric Road
Fortress Hill Road
Harbour Parade
Hong Man Street
Hong On Street
Hong Shing Street
Java Road
Ka Yip Street
King's Road
King Wah Road
Kornhill Road
Lok Man Road
Oi Lai Street
Oi Yin Street
Oil Street
Shau Kei Wan Road
Sheung On Street
Shing Tai Road
Shun Tai Road
Stanley Gap Road
Sun Yip Street
Tai Koo Shing Road
Tai Koo Wan Road
Tai Man Road
Tai Mou Avenue
Tin Chiu Street
Tin Hau Temple Road
Tsat Tsz Mui Road
Tung Hei Road
Wharf Road
Westland Road
Wing Tai Road

The Mid-Levels

Albany Road
Albert Path
Arbuthnot Road
Babington Path
Black's Link
Conduit Road
Mount Butler Drive
Mount Davis Road
Borrett Road
Bowen Drive
Bowen Road
Breezy Path
Brewin Path
Boyce Road
Briar Avenue
Caine Road
Caine Lane
Chancery Lane
Castle Road
Elliot Crescent
Glenealy
Hornsey Road
Lyttleton Road
MacDonnell Road
Mosque Junction
Ning Yeung Terrace
Oaklands Road
Old Peak Road
Park Road
Peak Road
Rednaxela Terrace
Robinson Road
Magazine Gap Road
Seymour Road
Seymour Terrace
Stubbs Road
Upper Albert Road
Wong Nai Chung Gap Road

The Peak

Barker Road
Bluff Path
Gough Hill Road
Guildford Road
Lugard Road
May Road
Mount Austin Road
Mount Kellett Road
Pollock's Path

Southern District

Aberdeen Main Road
Aberdeen Praya Road
Aberdeen Reservoir Road
Ap Lei Chau Bridge Road
Ap Lei Chau Drive
Ap Lei Chau Praya Drive
Beach Road
Bel-air Avenue
Bel-air Rise
Bisney Road
Cyberport Road
Deep Water Bay Road
Island Road
Nam Fung Road
Northcote Close
Pok Fu Lam Road
Repulse Bay Road
Sandy Bay Road
Sassoon Road
South Bay Road
Tin Wan Praya Road
Wong Chuk Hang Road

Causeway Bay, Central, Happy Valley, Wan Chai, Western District

Aberdeen Street
Amoy Street
Anton Street
Arsenal Street
Bank Street
Battery Path
Belcher's Street
Blue Pool Road
Boat Street
Bonham Road
Bonham Strand 
Bonham Strand West
Bridges Street
Broadwood Road
Broom Road
Brown Street
Bullock Lane
Burd Street
Burrows Street
Cadogan Street
Canal Road East
Canal Road West
Centre Street
Chater Road
Cleveland Street
Cochrane Street
Connaught Road Central
Connaught Road West
Connaught Place
Cotton Tree Drive
Cross Street
D'Aguilar Street
Davis Street
Des Voeux Road Central
Des Voeux Road West
Drake Street
Duddell Street
Eastern Street
Elgin Street
Fenwick Street
First Street
Fleming Road
Gage Street
Garden Road
Gilman Street
Gilman's Bazaar
Glenealy
Gloucester Road
Gordon Road
Great George Street
Gresson Street
Gutzlaff Street
Harbour Road
Harcourt Road
Haven Street
Hennessy Road
High Street
Hill Road
Hillier Street
Hing Hon Road
Hollywood Road
Hospital Road
Ice House Street
Jardine's Bazaar
Johnston Road
Jubilee Street
Ka Wai Man Road
Kennedy Road
Kennedy Town Praya
New Praya Kennedy Town 
King's Road
Ko Shing Street
Kotewall Road
Ladder Street
Lambeth Walk
Lan Kwai Fong
Lee Tung Street
Leighton Road
Li Yuen Street East
Lockhart Road
Lower Albert Road
Luard Road
Lung Wo Road
Lung Wui Road
Lyndhurst Terrace
Mallory Street
Man Cheung Street
Man Kwong Street
Man Po Road
Man Wa Lane
Man Yiu Street
Marsh Road
McGregor Street
Monmouth Path
Morrison Hill Road
Murray Road
Oi Kwan Road
Old Bailey Street
On Lan Street
Pak Tsz Lane
Paterson Street
Pedder Street
Peel Street
Percival Street
Po Hing Fong
Pokfield Road
Possession Street
Pottinger Street
Pound Lane
Queen Victoria Street
Queen's Road East
Queen's Road Central
Queen's Road West
Queensway
Rodney Street
Russell Street
Saint Joseph Terrace
Sands Street
Second Street
Sharp Street East
Sharp Street West
Shing Tai Road
Ship Street
Siu Fai Terrace
Siu Sai Wan Road
Smithfield
Spring Garden Lane
Stanley Street
Staunton Street
Staveley Street
St. Francis Street
Stone Nullah Lane
Swatow Street
Tai Hang Road
Tai Ping Shan Street
Tai Tam Road
Tai Yuen Street
Thomson Road
Tim Wa Avenue
Tim Mei Avenue
Tin Lok Lane
Third Street
Theatre Lane
Tonnochy Road
Tung Street
Victoria Road
Wan Chai Road
Water Street
Wellington Street
West End Terrace
Western Street
Whitty Street
Wing Fung Street
Wing Kut Street
Wing On Street
Wing Sing Street
Wong Nai Chung Road
Wood Road
Wun Sha Street
Wyndham Street
Yee Wo Street
Yuen Yuen Street

Kowloon and New Kowloon
South of Boundary Street

Argyle Street
Arran Street
Ashley Road
Austin Road 
Austin Road West
Blenheim Avenue
Boundary Street
Bowring Street
Bristol Avenue
Bulkeley Street
Bute Street
Canton Road
Cameron Road
Carnarvon Road
Chatham Road North
Chatham Road South
Chatham Court
Cheong Tung Road
Cherry Street
Chung Hau Street
Cox's Road
Dundas Street
Duke Street
Dunbar Road
Fa Yuen Street
Fat Kwong Street
Ferry Street
Fife Street
Forfar Road
Gascoigne Road
Gateway Road
Gillies Avenue South
Gillies Avenue North
Gullane Road
Haiphong Road
Hankow Road
Hanoi Road
Hart Avenue
Hillwood Road
Humphreys Avenue
Hung Hom Bypass
Hung Hom Road
Ichang Street
Jordan Road
Kansu Street
Kei Lung Street
Kimberley Street
Kimberley Road
Knight Street
Knutsford Terrace
Kowloon City Road
Kowloon Park Drive
Kwong Wa Street
Kwun Chung Street
Lai Chi Kok Road
Lomond Road
La Salle Road
Luen Wan Street
Ma Tau Chung Road
Ma Tau Kok Road
Ma Tau Wai Road
Maidstone Road
Market Street
Middle Road
Minden Avenue
Minden Row
Mody Road
Mong Kok Road
Nanking Street
Nathan Road
Nelson Street
Observatory Road
Peking Road
Pitt Street
Portland Street
Prat Avenue
Prince Edward Road West 
Princess Margaret Road
Public Square Street
Reclamation Street
Sai Yee Street
Sai Yeung Choi Street North
Sai Yeung Choi Street South 
Saigon Street
Salisbury Road
Scout Path
Shanghai Street
Shantung Street
Soy Street
Stirling Road
Temple Street
Tai Wan Road
To Kwa Wan Road
Tung Choi Street
Tweed Road
Victory Avenue
Waterloo Road
Woosung Street
Wuhu Street
Wylie Road
Yen Chow Street West
Yim Po Fong Street

North of Boundary Street

Apliu Street
Alnwick Road
Baptist University Road
Beacon Hill Road
Boundary Street
Broadcast Drive
Broadway
Castle Peak Road
Cheung Sha Wan Road
Ching Cheung Road
Choi Wan Road
Choi Ha Road
Chun Wah Road
Clear Water Bay Road
College Road
Cornwall Street
Cumberland Road
Dorset Crescent
Ede Road
Essex Crescent
Fuk Wa Street
Fung Tak Road
Fung Shing Street
Glee Path
Grampian Road
Hammer Hill Road
Hereford Road
Hing Wah Street
Hip Wo Street
Hiu Kwong Street
Hong Ning Road
Ho Tung Road
Humbert Street
Inverness Road
Kai Cheung Road
Kai Fuk Road
Kei Lung Street
Kent Road
Lai Chi Kok Road
Lai Wan Road
Lancashire Road
La Salle Road
Lung Cheung Road
Mei Lai Road
Nam Cheong Street
Nassau Street
New Clear Water Bay Road
Nga Tsin Wai Road
Ngau Tau Kok Road
Oxford Road
Pei Ho Street
Pilgrim's Way
Ping Ting Road
Po Kong Village Road
Po Lun Street
Prince Edward Road East
Prince Edward Road West
Renfrew Road
Rutland Road
Sham Shing Road
Tai Po Road
Tai Hang Tung Road
Tai Hang Sai Street
Tonkin Street
Wai Yip Street
Wang Chiu Road
Wang Kwong Road
Warwick Road
Waterloo Road
Woh Chai Street
Yen Chow Street
Ying Wa Street
York Road
Yue Man Square
Yuet Lun Street
Yu Chau Street

New Territories

Castle Peak Road
Fei Ngo Shan Road
Lam Kam Road
Route Twisk
Sha Tau Kok Road
Tai Po Road
Tuen Mun Road

Fanling
Pik Fung Road
Po Kak Tsai Road

Kam Tin, Pat Heung and Shek Kong 
Kam Sheung Road
Kam Tin Road

Kwai Chung

Castle Peak Road - Kwai Chung
Container Port Road and Container Port Road South
Hing Fong Road
Joint Street
Hing Wash Street West
King Cho Road
Kwai Chung Road
Kwai Fuk Road
Kwai Shing Circuit
Kwai Tsing Road
Lai Chi Ling Road
Lai Cho Road
Lai King Hill Road
Lei Muk Road
Lim Cho Street
Princess Margaret Hospital Road
Shek Pai Street
Tai Lin Pai Road
Tai Wo Hau Road
Texaco Road
Wo Yi Hop Road

Sai Kung

Chan Man Street
Che Keng Tuk Road
Chui Tong Road
Chuk Yeung Road
Fui Yiu Lane
Fuk Man Road
Fung Sau Road
Hiram's Highway
Hong Fu Road
Hong Kin Road
Hong Nin Path
Hong Ting Road
Hong Tsuen Road
Kak Hang Tun Road
King Man Street
Keng Pang Ha Road
Lung Mei Tsuen Road
Man Nin Street
Mei Yu Street
Mei Yuen Street
Muk Min Shan Road
Nam Shan San Tsuen Road
Nin Chun Street
Pak Kong Road
See Cheung Street
Sha Kok Mei Road
Tai Mong Tsai Road
Tso Wo Road
Wan King Path
Yan Yee Road
Yi Chun Street

San Tin 
San Sham Road

Sha Tau Kok 
Chung Ying Street

Sha Tin

A Kung Kok Street
Au Pui Wan Street
Chap Wai Kon Street
Che Kung Miu Road
Fo Tan Road
Fung Shek Street
Fung Shun Street
Ho Lek Pui Street
Hung Mui Kuk Road
Jat Min Chuen Street
Kam Ying Road
Kong Pui Street
Lek Yuen Street
Lok King Street
Lok Lam Street
Ma On Shan Road
Mei Tin Road
Ngan Shing Street
Ngau Pei Shan Street
On Chun Street
On Yuen Street
On Luk Street
Pai Tau Street
Pak Tak Street
Pok Chuen Street
Sai Sha Road
Siu Lek Yuen Road
Sha Kok Street
Sha On Street
Sha Tin Road
Sha Tin Centre Street
Sha Tin Rural Committee Road
Sha Tin Wai Road
Sha Tin Tau Road
Shan Mei Street
Shui Chuen Au Street
Sui Wo Road
Tai Chung Kiu Road
Tak Kei Street
Tak Lee Street
Tak Yi Street
Tam Kon Po Street
Tin Sam Street
To Fung Shan Road
Tsung Tau Ha Road
Wang Pok Street
Wo Che Street
Wo Heung Street
Wo Liu Hang Street
Wo Shing Street
Wo Shui Street
Yat Tai Street
Yuen Chau Kok Road
Yuen Wo Road

Sheung Shui
Fan Kam Road
San Fung Avenue

Tai Po
Kwong Fuk Road
Tai Po-Tai Wo Road
Ting Kok Road
Yuen Shin Road

Tseung Kwan O
Ngan O Road
Po Lam Road
Wan Po Road

Tsing Yi

Ching Hong Road
Chung Mei Road
Cheung Wan Road
Fung Shue Wo Road
Tam Kon Shan Road
Tsing Yi Heung Sze Wui Road
Tsing Yi Road
Tsing Yi Road West
Tsing Yi Main Street
Tsing Yi North Coastal Road

Tsuen Wan

Castle Peak Road - Tsuen Wan
Chuen Lung Street
Chung On Street
Ma Tau Pa Road
Route Twisk
Sha Tsui Road
Shing Mun Road
Tai Chung Road
Tai Ho Road and Tai Ho Road North
Texaco Road and Texaco Road North
Tsing Tsuen Road
Tsuen King Circuit
 Tsuen Wan Road
Yeung Uk Road

Tuen Mun

Lung Mun Road
Ming Kum Road
Sam Shing Street
Shek Pai Tau Road
Tsing Tin Road
Tsing Wun Road
Tuen Mun Heung Sze Wui Road
Wong Chu Road
Wu King Road
Wu Shan Road
Pui To Road

Yau Kom Tau
Yau Lai Road

Yuen Long
 Castle Peak Road
On Lok Road
Long Lok Road

Outlying Islands

Chek Lap Kok Airport

Airport Road
Airport Expo Boulevard
Catering Road West
Catering Road Central
Catering Road East
Chek Lap Kok South Road
Cheong Hing Road
Cheong Hong Road
Cheong King Road
Cheong Lin Path
Cheong Lin Road
Cheong Shun Road
Cheong Tat Road
Cheong Wing Road
Cheong Wong Road
Cheong Yip Road
Chung Cheung Road
East Coast Road
Kwo Lo Wan Road
North Perimeter Road
Runway Road South
Sky City Road
Sky Plaza Drive
Sky Plaza Road
South Perimeter Road

Cheung Chau
Cheung Chau is not accessible by vehicle, roads are only used by pedestrians, cyclists and some licensed vehicles.
Pak Sha Praya Road
Pak Shue Street
Peak Road
Sun Hing Street
Tung Wa Road

Lamma
 Chimney Road
 Main Street, Yung Shue Wan
 Precipitor Road
 Sok Kwu Wan First Street
 Sok Kwu Wan Second Street
 Sok Kwu Wan Third Street
 Stacker Road

Lantau

Peng Chau 
 Ho King Street
 Po Peng Street

Bus priority

Monitoring major roads
The traffic CAM online provides near real-time road conditions for all major road users, as well as facilitating monitoring of traffic. 
There are about 115 closed-circuit cameras located on the routes to provide monitoring of traffic flow. Congestion is heaviest in Kowloon and along the northern shore of Hong Kong Island, where most cameras are located.

Some example locations:

 Cross Harbour Tunnel Hong Kong exit
 Aberdeen Tunnel Happy Valley entrance
 Cross Harbour Tunnel Kowloon entrance
 Kwai Tsing Interchange 
 Tsuen Wan  Road 
 Tuen Mun  Road

See also

Roads in Hong Kong (category)
Hong Kong Guide – Offering list of streets and roads.

References

External links
Snapshot of Traffic Condition
Live webcast of Traffic Condition
Highways Department
Strategic Route Numbering System
Road Traffic Information Service – Offering live videos and images of current traffic conditions in Hong Kong

 Bridges in Hong Kong
Streets and roads
Hong Kong
 
 Tunnels in Hong Kong
Hong Kong